List of hospitals in Texas (U.S. state), sorted alphabetically.

References

Texas
 
Hospitals